Banush or banosh is a dish prepared from cornmeal with added smetana (cream), topped with pork rind, mushrooms, and bryndza etc. The dish is considered to be a part of Ukrainian cuisine, in particularly Hutsul. It is popular in the Carpathian region in West Ukraine and Romania.

See also
Polenta
Mămăligă
List of maize dishes
Ukrainian cuisine

References

Ukrainian cuisine
Maize dishes